Deadline is a 1959–61 American television drama series that re-enacted famous newspaper stories from the past. Hosted and narrated by Paul Stewart, the syndicated series was produced by Arnold Perl. Guest stars included Peter Falk, Will Kuluva, Diane Ladd, Robert Lansing, George Maharis, Simon Oakland, Edgar Stehli, and Paul Stevens. Thirty-nine 30-minute episodes were produced. Deadline, a syndicated anthology series, scored high by making its plot lines secondary to its violent action  content. It was an Official Films production.

In November 2019, Film Chest studios acquired and restored all 39 episodes for release on DVD as a complete collection for the first time.

Episodes

References

External links

1959 American television series debuts
1961 American television series endings
1950s American anthology television series
1960s American anthology television series
First-run syndicated television programs in the United States